The 1996 Oregon State Beavers football team represented Oregon State University in the 1996 NCAA Division I-A football season. Led by sixth-year head coach Jerry Pettibone, the Beavers were 2–9 overall (1–7 in Pac-10, last) for the program's 26th consecutive losing season.  The Beavers were outscored 388 to 216, the most points allowed by an Oregon State team since 1987.

Pettibone resigned at the end of the season in late November, and was succeeded by Mike Riley in 1997.

Schedule

Roster

References

Oregon State
Oregon State Beavers football seasons
Oregon State Beavers football